The Revenant(s) or Revenant(s) may refer to:

 Revenant, in folklore, an animated corpse that haunts the living

Film and television
 Le revenant, a 1903 film by Georges Méliès
 Le revenant or A Lover's Return, a 1946 French drama
 The Revenant (2009 film), a horror comedy
 The Revenant (2015 film), an epic Western adventure
 "Revenant" (Batman Beyond), a television episode

Literature
 Revenant (Buffy novel), based on the TV series Buffy the Vampire Slayer
 The Revenant (comics), published in various forms from 2001 to 2008
 The Revenant (novel), a 2002 novel by Michael Punke, basis for the 2015 film
 "The Revenant", a 2006 short story by Lucy Sussex

Music
 The Revenant (soundtrack), a soundtrack album from the 2015 film
 Revenants (album) or the title song, by Conducting from the Grave, 2010
 Revenant Records, a record label set up by John Fahey

Video games
 Revenant (video game), a 1999 game
 Revenant, a character in the video game Apex Legends
 Revenant, a character in the Soulcaliber series

Other uses
 The Revenants, a 2012 Doctor Who audio drama
 Revenant Mountain, Alberta, Canada
 French corvette Revenant, an Age of Sail privateer
 The Revenant (horse), racehorse, winner of the 2020 Queen Elizabeth II Stakes

See also
 Les Revenants (disambiguation)